The Albanian embassy in The Hague (Dutch: Albanese Ambassade in Den Haag) is Albania's diplomatic mission to the Netherlands. It is located at Hoge Nieuwstraat 22 2514EL

Diplomatic relations between the Republic of Albania and the Kingdom of the Netherlands were established on 17 November 1970.

The current Ambassador of Albania in the Netherlands is Aida Sakiqi.

See also 
 Albania–Netherlands relations

References

The Hague
Albania
Albania–Netherlands relations